The Annali dell'Istituto Superiore di Sanità is a quarterly peer-reviewed open access scientific journal covering biomedicine, the health sciences, and translational research. It is published by the Istituto Superiore di Sanità (ISS) and was established in 1965. It was the successor to the Rendiconti Istituto Superiore di Sanità, which were established in 1938 and published until 1962. The editor-in-chief is Enrico Alleva (ISS).

Abstracting and indexing 
The journal is abstracted and indexed in Index Medicus/MEDLINE/PubMed, EMBASE/Excerpta Medica, SCIELO , Science Citation Index Expanded, and The Zoological Record. According to the Journal Citation Reports, the journal has a 2020 impact factor of 1.663.

References

External links 
 

Open access journals
Public health journals
Quarterly journals
English-language journals
Academic journals published by independent research institutes